Ivan Khobta (born 31 July 2003) is a Ukrainian pair skater. With his skating partner, Violetta Sierova, he is the 2023 World Junior bronze medalist and a two-time silver medalist on the ISU Junior Grand Prix series (2022 JGP Poland I and 2022 JGP Poland II). Competing as seniors, they are the 2022 Ice Challenge bronze medalists and 2021 Ukrainian national champions.

Personal life 
Khobta was born on 31 July 2003 in Kyiv, Ukraine.

Programs

With Sierova

Competitive highlights 
CS: Challenger Series; JGP: Junior Grand Prix

With Sierova

References

External links 
 

2003 births
Living people
Ukrainian male figure skaters
Ukrainian male pair skaters
Sportspeople from Kyiv